Mark Allen Hackel (born May 15, 1962) is an American politician serving as the County Executive of Macomb County, Michigan since the position was established in 2011. A member of the Democratic Party, Hackel previously served as the Macomb County Sheriff from 2001 to 2010.

Background
Born in Detroit, Michigan, to Ada and William H. Hackel. Mark Hackel is the second of three sons. He attended public schools. By high school his family had moved to Sterling Heights, Michigan, where he graduated from Sterling Heights High School. He followed his father into a career in law enforcement. Hackel's brother, William Hackel III, became an attorney. In July 2009 he was appointed as judge of the second division Michigan's 42nd District Court by Governor Jennifer Granholm.

Mark Hackel earned a Bachelor of Arts degree from Wayne State University in Criminal Justice, and joined the sheriff's department in Macomb County in 1981. He later earned a master's degree in public administration from Central Michigan University. While working at the sheriff's department, he also received training at the FBI National Academy and the U.S. Secret Service's dignitary protection school.

Hackel has taught classes in criminal justice and leadership at Macomb Community College and at Wayne State University.

Macomb County Sheriff
Mark Hackel was one of 15 candidates to run in the primary on August 8, 2000, for the Democratic Party nomination for Macomb County Sheriff. Likely benefiting from name recognition, Hackel captured 46% of the vote.  He defeated Republican Steve Thomas in the general election for sheriff in November 2000, winning 52% of the vote to become county sheriff. Hackel won re-election in 2004 and 2008, defeating Republican candidate Kristi Dean both times. In his 2008 victory, Hackel received 78.4 percent of the vote and set a new record of 314,778 total votes for a county-wide elected office.

In early 2007 Hackel and his office received national attention during their investigation of the homicide death of Tara Grant, whose body was found dismembered. Her husband, Stephen Grant, confessed to police and was charged with murder. Grant was convicted of second-degree murder in his wife's death in December 2007 and was sentenced to 50 to 80 years in prison by Macomb County Circuit Court Judge Diane Druzinski in February 2008.

Hackel resigned as sheriff on December 31, 2010, to begin his term as county executive.

County Executive
On December 3, 2008, Hackel announced that he had formed an exploratory committee looking at the possibility of a run for Governor of Michigan in 2010. He later decided to run instead for the new position of Macomb County Executive, which had been approved by voters in 2008. Unopposed in the Democratic primary, Hackel won the nomination.

On November 2, 2010, he was elected as the first Macomb County Executive, receiving 66 percent of the vote and defeating Republican Randell Shaffer, who had 31 percent, and Libertarian Erin Stahl, who had 3 percent.  Hackel resigned his position as sheriff on December 31, 2010, and took office as county executive for a four-year term starting on January 1, 2011.
On December 7, 2010, Hackel named Mark Deldin, Chippewa Valley Schools Superintendent, as his deputy county executive.

In November 2014, Hackel defeated Republican David Novak to win a second-term as county executive, taking 69 percent of almost 260,000 votes.

He easily won a third term in November 2018.

Relations with the Democratic Party
While Hackel has been successful in winning Democratic Party nominations and general elections, his relations with the party and other candidates has been at best ambivalent at times. He has crossed party lines to endorse Republican candidates for some county and state offices, offending some party regulars. In addition, some fellow Democrats in Macomb County have said that he is too willing to work with Republicans, including Gov. Rick Snyder. In 2013, Hackel instructed the County Clerk's office not to identify him as a Democrat in the county directory of elected officials.

During Michigan's gubernatorial election in 2014, Hackel originally said that he would stay neutral, rather than endorsing the presumptive Democratic nominee, former US Congressman Mark Schauer. Hackel eventually "reluctantly" endorsed Schauer, who was defeated by the incumbent Snyder.

In 2016, Hackel crossed party lines by endorsing Republican U.S. Representative Candice Miller, a former Macomb County Treasurer with whom he had worked, in her bid to unseat 6-term Democratic incumbent Anthony Marrocco in the race for Macomb County Public Works Commissioner. He said, "The point is to endorse people that you believe are the ones that are going to be the most effective in making things happen. The working relationship I would get with a person like Candice Miller would far exceed any expectations the public would have or that I would have."

In 2018, despite having endorsed the statewide Democratic ticket, Hackel refused to back Fred Miller, the Democratic nominee for the 2018 special election for Macomb County Clerk. Hackel initially backed state senator Steve Bieda in the Democratic primary. After Miller won the nomination, Hackel supported Miller's Republican opponent, Lisa Sinclair, although they had never met. Hackel said that he felt Miller and County Clerk Carmella Sabaugh had conspired to "rig" the 2016 clerk election. Miller filed to run minutes before Michigan's deadline, in order to appear on the August primary ballot; while at the same time, Sabaugh withdrew from the race minutes before Michigan's deadline to be removed from the ballot, essentially leaving the Democratic nomination open to Miller.

In the midst of the COVID-19 pandemic in the United States, Hackel expressed support for a citizen-backed initiative to repeal a 1945 law that gives Democratic Gov. Gretchen Whitmer powers to declare a state of emergency without the consent of the state legislature. Whitmer has used the emergency powers to keep many sections of the Michigan economy completely or partially closed during the pandemic.

Political future
Hackel has thrice flirted with running for Governor of Michigan, considering running in the 2010, 2014, and 2018 elections. He put out early feelers in 2008 and in 2012.  Hackel eventually decided to run for and was elected as Macomb County Executive in 2010. The Republican candidate, Rick Snyder, won the governorship.

In October 2012, Hackel was reportedly considering a run at the governorship in 2014. But in January 2013, Hackel announced that he would not run for governor in 2014, but would instead focus on running for re-election as county executive.

Again in May 2017, Hackel suggested he might run for governor, either as a Democrat or independent. He eventually ran for a third term as county executive, and again won the primary and general elections by a wide margin.

Electoral history

References

External links
 www.MacombSheriff.com
 MarkHackel.com
 2008 election results from Macomb County clerk's office
 2004 election results from Macomb County clerk's office
 Office of the County Executive

1962 births
Central Michigan University alumni
County executives in Michigan
Living people
Michigan Democrats
Michigan sheriffs
People from Macomb County, Michigan
People from Sterling Heights, Michigan
Wayne State University alumni